USS Phoenix may refer to the following ships of the United States Navy: 

 , a 2-gun schooner, built in 1841 and sold in 1853
 , an American wooden whaler based in New London, Connecticut, sunk as a breakwater in 1861
 , a Brooklyn-class light cruiser, transferred to Argentina in 1951, and sunk during the Falklands War
  (previously USS Phoenix (AG-172), a Phoenix-class miscellaneous auxiliary, sold to the Philippines in 1973
 , a Los Angeles-class submarine, decommissioned and stricken in 1998

United States Navy ship names